Jenő Dalnoki (12 December 1932 – 4 February 2006) was a Hungarian footballer. As a player Dalnoki played for both Ferencvárosi TC and Hungary. He had the reputation as a tough defender as well as a tough coach. He won a gold medal in football at the 1952 Summer Olympics and a bronze medal in football at the 1960 Summer Olympics.

References

1932 births
2006 deaths
Footballers from Budapest
Hungarian footballers
Hungary international footballers
Ferencvárosi TC footballers
Footballers at the 1952 Summer Olympics
Footballers at the 1960 Summer Olympics
Olympic footballers of Hungary
Olympic gold medalists for Hungary
Olympic bronze medalists for Hungary
Hungarian football managers
Ferencvárosi TC managers
FC Tatabánya managers
Olympic medalists in football
Medalists at the 1960 Summer Olympics
Medalists at the 1952 Summer Olympics
Association football defenders
Nemzeti Bajnokság I managers